Andrea Carlo Francisco Rabagliati (1843 in Scotland – 7 December 1930 in Bradford, England) was a physician and author of books on dietary practice.

Career

Andrea Rabagliati was the son of Giacomo Rabagliati, a political refugee from Italy, and Caroline Kinnison. Giacomo first appeared in an article in the Scotsman newspaper in December 1827, offering his services as a teacher of French, Italian, and Spanish. The Scotsman stated, "suffice it to say, that he (Giacomo) is expatriated from Italy for having carried arms in defence of the liberties of his country, and seeks an asylum and a field for the exercise of his talents in the city." 

Andrea graduated with a Master of Arts from the University of Edinburgh, spent some time in Demerara in what was then British Guyana, then arrived in Bradford as a young house surgeon at the Royal Infirmary. He was invested as a Fellow, Royal College of Surgeons of Edinburgh (F.R.C.S.E.). He lived in Whinbrae, Ben Rhydding, Yorkshire, England. 

He married Helen Priscilla McLaren, daughter of Duncan McLaren and Priscilla Bright McLaren (sister of John Bright), on 25 May 1877. She was the President of Ben Rhydding Women's Unionist Association for 28 years and of the Wharfedale Conservative Women's Club for several years after World War One. They had five children including Euan Rabagliati, Duncan Silvestro Rabagliati OBE, Catherine Rabagliati MBE (Mayor of Paddington) and Herman Victor Rabagliati.

Dieting

Rabagliati has been described as an advocate of alternative medicine and the "nature cure". Biographer Carole Seymour-Jones has noted that in his book Air, Food and Exercise, Rabagliati described how "cancer, influenza, pneumonia and almost all modern diseases could be cured by diet."

Rabagliati was a convinced vegetarian, who favoured two meals a day, with eight hours between them. One of his notable patients was Beatrice Webb. She was prescribed a milk and soup diet with two ounces of rice for a few weeks. She was influenced by this diet and in 1902 converted to vegetarianism. Rabagliati believed that people could add fifteen years to their lives by following his diet.

Rabagliati held some unorthodox ideas, for example he believed that bodily energy and heat do not come from any food source. Instead he speculated that humans obtain "vital energy" from sleeping.  He authored a book about this in 1907 and wrote the introduction to Hereward Carrington's Vitality, Fasting and Nutrition, which expounded on these ideas. A review in the Edinburgh Medical Journal, suggested he was advocating a "modified form of vitalism". His 1907 book was mocked in the Scottish Medical and Surgical Journal, which commented "we are in doubt as to whether to take this book seriously or not. If the latter, it is one of the best scientific jokes perpetrated for many a day."

Publications

Aphorisms, Definitions, Reflections, and Paradoxes, Medical, Surgical and Dietetic (1901), Bailliere, Tindall and Cox, 291p
Air, Food and Exercises;: An Essay on the Predisposing Causes of Disease (1904, 3rd Edition) 
The Functions of Food in the Body: Does Either Bodily Energy or Bodily Heat Come From the Food? (1907), Elliot Stock, London, 46p
Conversations With Women Regarding their Health and that of their Children (1912), C.W.Daniel, London, 318p
Initis Or Nutrition and Exercises (1930, 2nd Edition), C. W. Daniel Company, London, 200p
Towards Life: Happy, Healthy, Efficient (1923), C. W. Daniel Company, London, 224p, 
 A Catechism of Health (1928) C. W. Daniel Company, London.
A New Theory of Energy (Paperback)  (2005 reprint), Kessinger Publishing, 48p,

References

Further reading

Alexander Bryce. (1912). Rabagliati on Energy. In Modern Theories of Diet and Their Bearings Upon Practical Dietetics. New York: Longman's Green & Co.
Charles Mosley, editor, Burke's Peerage and Baronetage, 106th edition, 2 volumes.

1843 births
1930 deaths
19th-century Scottish medical doctors
Alumni of the University of Edinburgh
British health and wellness writers
Fellows of the Royal College of Surgeons of Edinburgh
Pseudoscientific diet advocates
Scottish non-fiction writers
Scottish people of Italian descent
Vitalists
Medical doctors from Bradford